She was a British women's monthly magazine that ran for 56 years, from  1955 to September 2011, and was published by Hearst Magazines UK.

She had a monthly circulation of 144,583 in 2010.

References

1955 establishments in the United Kingdom
2011 disestablishments in the United Kingdom
Monthly magazines published in the United Kingdom
Defunct women's magazines published in the United Kingdom
Magazines established in 1955
Magazines disestablished in 2011